Wildebeest is the name of different characters appearing in American comic books published by DC Comics.

History

Wildebeest I
The first Wildebeest is a poacher and mercenary who was an enemy of Chris King and Vicki Grant.

Wildebeest Society
The second Wildebeest was a supervillain whose real name was never revealed, and who set up the Wildebeest Society, a criminal cartel that conducted various underhanded affairs for financial gain. Although the Society was made up of many members (some of them having previously worked for the H.I.V.E.), only one Wildebeest ever operated publicly, giving the illusion that all of their crimes were being committed by a single individual. The thinking behind this was that there would appear to be one villain, but "his" M.O. would seem to change with each crime, making "his" next move impossible to predict.

In his first encounter with the Teen Titans, Wildebeest had framed Starfire for murder. He used a robot likeness to antagonize Starfire and then swapped it out with a suit containing a dead man. Nightwing found the evidence to prove Starfire's innocence.

Wildebeest's second attempt to destroy the Teen Titans involved him breaking into S.T.A.R. Labs and capturing the pregnant Mother Mayhem whose baby would become the new Brother Blood. Wildebeest later set up a group of second-second string villains (consisting of Gizmo, Disruptor, Puppeteer, and Trident) and caused the people to think that a new supervillain group was being formed. While Mother Mayhem gave birth to her child, the villains were defeated, but Wildebeest escaped.

Wildebeest later took control of Cyborg (which caused people to think that the Wildebeest Society had connections at S.T.A.R. Labs) and used him to attack the Teen Titans.

In time, the Wildebeest Society fell under the sway of the former New Titan Jericho (who himself had been possessed by all of the disparate souls of Azarath). The corrupted Jericho took control of the Wildebeest Society. Under the leadership of Jericho, the Wildebeest Society began conducting a series of genetic chemical-organic experiments to create the perfect host bodies for the evil spirits to possess. They began their genetic alterations on humans and animals. All of their experiments failed except for the human/panther hybrid labeled X-24 (who later became Pantha) which escaped and vowed vengeance on the Wildebeest Society. Jericho then staged an elaborate "Titans Hunt" to capture current and former members of the Teen Titans in order to acquire host bodies to contain the souls of Azarath when their experiments were failing to yield results. The Titans were rescued by Pantha, Arella, Phantasm, Red Star, and Jericho's father Deathstroke. At the conclusion of this affair, the Wildebeest Society was destroyed and Jericho was killed at the hands of Deathstroke when Jericho broke free from the possession and begged his father to kill him. The final experiment by the Wildebeest Society called Baby Wildebeest fell into the Teen Titans' custody.

Baby Wildebeest

New Wildebeests
At the time when the Titans were affected by Klarion the Witch Boy's aging spell, the demonic supervillain Goth took advantage of this and allied with Contessa Erica Alexandra de Portanza. They created upgraded versions of the Wildebeests. These Wildebeests looked like their predecessors, but were actual humanoid wildebeest-like monsters when they were unmasked. Goth commanded these Wildebeests to JFK International Airport and Grand Central Station. The Titans eventually contained these Wildebeests. Another set of these Wildebeests are encountered in Brooklyn by Beast Boy and Flamebird where they assumed that these Wildebeests were a threat. They soon discover that these Wildebeests had been tamed and domesticated by an elderly gentleman in order to keep the neighborhood safe.

Cybernetic Wildebeest
When Starfire and Tim Drake were abducted from Titans Tower, the Teen Titans worked with the Outsiders to find them. Nightwing was able to track them to the abandoned basement of the New York Titans Tower where their captor was a cybernetic-enhanced Wildebeest. The Teen Titans and the Outsiders were able to defeat the Cybernetic Wildebeest and ship it to S.T.A.R. Labs. The transport containing the Cybernetic Wildebeest was intercepted by a mysterious man who was responsible for creating the Cybernetic Wildebeest.

It was revealed that the Cybernetic Wildebeests were the works of Project M (an experimental super-soldier program which was led by the mysterious Mr. Elias Orr) where the cybernetic parts of the Cybernetic Wildebeest derived from the technology that is based on Cyborg's technology.

Powers and abilities
The members of the Wildebeest Society were all master tacticians and wore exoskeletons that boosted their strength, resembling a monstrous, humanoid version of the animal of that name.

The New Wildebeests are fierce and feral. They can be properly trained by whoever can successfully tame them.

The Cybernetic Wildebeests are fierce and are enhanced by their cybernetic parts.

In other media

Television
 Wildebeest appears in Teen Titans, with vocal effects provided by Jim Cummings in his first appearance and by Dee Bradley Baker in subsequent appearances. In the episode "Winner Take All", Wildebeest, among others, is summoned by the Master of Games to participate in the Tournament of Champions. After Robin, Speedy, and Cyborg defeat the Master of Games, Wildebeest is made an honorary member of the Teen Titans. In "Trust", the Brotherhood of Evil capture and flash-freeze Wildebeest. In "Titans Together", the Titans rescue the Brotherhood's captives and join forces with them to defeat the Brotherhood.
 Wildebeest makes a cameo appearance in the Teen Titans Go! (2013) episode "Campfire Stories".

Miscellaneous
The Teen Titans animated series incarnation of Wildebeest, with elements of Baby Wildebeest, appears in issue #16 of Teen Titans Go! (2004). This version is revealed to be a metahuman toddler who transforms into Wildebeest whenever he is agitated.

References

External links
 Wildebeest I at DC Comics Wiki
 Wildebeest Society at DC Comics Wiki
 Wildebeest Society at Comic Vine
 Wildebeest Society at Titans Tower
 New Wildebeests at Titans Tower
 Cybernetic Wildebeest at Titans Tower

Characters created by Marv Wolfman
Comics characters introduced in 1981
Comics characters introduced in 1987
DC Comics characters with superhuman strength
DC Comics superheroes
DC Comics supervillains
DC Comics supervillain teams